Metastasis-associated protein MTA3 is a protein that in humans is encoded by the MTA3 gene. MTA3 protein localizes in the nucleus as well as in other cellular compartments MTA3 is a component of the nucleosome remodeling and deacetylate (NuRD) complex and participates in gene expression. The expression pattern of MTA3 is opposite to that of MTA1 and MTA2 during mammary gland tumorigenesis. However, MTA3 is also overexpressed in a variety of human cancers.

Discovery 

Mouse Mta3 was initially identified as a partial cDNA with open reading frames in screening of a mouse keratinocyte cDNA library with a human MTA1 partial fragment by My G. Mahoney's research team. The full length Mta3 cDNA was cloned through 5'-RACE methodology using RNA from C57B1/6J mouse skin. The deduced amino acids and its comparison with the sequences in the GeneBank established MTA3 as the third MTA family member.

Gene and spliced variants 

The Mta3 is localized on chromosome 12p in mice and MTA3 on 2p21 in human. The human MTA3 gene contains 20 exons, and 19 alternative spliced transcripts. Of these, nine MTA3 transcripts are predicted to code six proteins of 392, 514, 515, 537, 590 and 594 amino acids long, two MTA3 transcripts code 18 amino acids and 91 amino acids polypeptides. The remaining 10 transcripts are non-coding RNAs. The murine Mta3 gene contains nine transcripts, six of which are predicted to code proteins ranging from 251 amino acids to 591 amino acids while one transcript codes for 40 amino acids polypeptide. The murine Mta3 gene contains two predicted non-coding RNAs.

Structure 

The overall organization of MTA3 protein domains is similar to the other two family members with a BAH (Bromo-Adjacent Homology), an ELM2 (egl-27 and MTA1 homology), a SANT (SWI, ADA2, N-CoR, TFIIIB-B), a GATA-like zinc finger, and one predicted bipartite nuclear localization signal (NLS). The SH3 motif of Mta3 allows it to interact with Fyn and Grb2 – both SH3 containing signaling proteins.

Function 

Functions of MTA3 are believed to be differentially regulated in the context of cancer-types. For example, MTA3 expression is downregulated in breast cancer and endometrioid adenocarcinomas. MTA3 is overexpressed in non-small cell lung cancer and human placenta and chorionic carcinoma cells. In breast cancer, loss of MTA3 promotes EMT and invasiveness of breast cancer cells via upregulating Snail, which in turn represses E-cadherin adhesion molecule. In the mammary epithelium and breast cancer cells, MTA3 is an estrogen regulated gene and part of a larger regulatory network involving MTA1 and MTAs, all modifiers of hormone response, and participate in the processes involved in growth and differentiation. Accordingly, the MTA3-NuRD complex regulates the expression of Wnt4 in mammary epithelial cells and mice, and controls Wnt4-dependent ductal morphogenesis.

In contrast to its repressive actions, MTA3 also stimulates the expression of HIF1α as well as its target genes under hypoxic conditions in trophoblasts and is thought to be involved in differentiation during pregnancy. MTA3-NuRD complex and downstream targets have been shown to participate in primitive hematopoietic and angiogenesis in a zebrafish model system As a part of BCL6 corepressor complex, MTA3 regulates BCL6-dependent repression of target genes, including PRDM1, and modulates the differentiation of B-cells.

Regulation 

The estrogen receptor-stimulates the expression of MTA3 in breast cancer cells. The SP1 transcription factor stimulates the transcription of MTA3. MicroRNA-495 inhibits the level of MTA3 mRNA as well as the growth and migration of non-small cell lung cancer cells. The β-elemene - a traditional Chinese medicine, upregulates MTA3's expression in breast cancer cells

Targets 

The MTA3-NuRD complex represses Snail, a master regulator of epithelial-to-mesenchymal transition (EMT), Wnt4 expression in mammary epithelial cells, and BCL6-corepressor target genes The MTA3-NuRD complex interacts with GATA3 to regulate the expression of GATA3 downstream targets. In addition, MTA3 upregulates HIF1 and its transactivation activity in hypoxic conditions.

Notes

References

External links 
 
 

Transcription factors